The American Academy of Arts and Sciences (AAA&S) is one of the oldest learned societies in the United States. It was founded in 1780 during the American Revolution by John Adams, John Hancock, James Bowdoin, Andrew Oliver, and other Founding Fathers of the United States. It is headquartered in Cambridge, Massachusetts.

Membership in the academy is achieved through a thorough petition, review, and election process. The academy's quarterly journal, Dædalus, is published by the MIT Press on behalf of the academy. The academy also conducts multidisciplinary public policy research.

History
The Academy was established by the Massachusetts legislature on May 4, 1780, charted in order "to cultivate every art and science which may tend to advance the interest, honor, dignity, and happiness of a free, independent, and virtuous people." The sixty-two incorporating fellows represented varying interests and high standing in the political, professional, and commercial sectors of the state. The first class of new members, chosen by the Academy in 1781, included Benjamin Franklin and George Washington as well as several international honorary members. The initial volume of Academy Memoirs appeared in 1785, and the Proceedings followed in 1846. In the 1950s, the Academy launched its journal Daedalus, reflecting its commitment to a broader intellectual and socially-oriented program.

Since the second half of the twentieth century, independent research has become a central focus of the Academy. In the late 1950s, arms control emerged as one of its signature concerns. The Academy also served as the catalyst in establishing the National Humanities Center in North Carolina. In the late 1990s, the Academy developed a new strategic plan, focusing on four major areas: science, technology, and global security; social policy and education; humanities and culture; and education. In 2002, the Academy established a visiting scholars program in association with Harvard University. More than 75 academic institutions from across the country have become Affiliates of the Academy to support this program and other Academy initiatives.

The Academy has sponsored a number of awards and prizes, throughout its history and has offered opportunities for fellowships and visiting scholars at the Academy. 

In July 2013, the Boston Globe exposed then president Leslie Berlowitz for falsifying her credentials, faking a doctorate, and consistently mistreating her staff. Berlowitz subsequently resigned.

Projects

The Humanities Indicators

A project of the Academy that equips researchers, policymakers, universities, foundations, museums, libraries, humanities councils, and other public institutions with statistical tools for answering basic questions about primary and secondary humanities education, undergraduate and graduate education in the humanities, the humanities workforce, levels and sources of program funding, public understanding and impact of the humanities, and other areas of concern in the humanities community. It is modeled on the Science and Engineering Indicators, published biennially by the National Science Board as required by Congress.

Membership

Founding members
Charter members of the Academy were John Adams, Samuel Adams, John Bacon, James Bowdoin, Charles Chauncy, John Clarke, David Cobb, Samuel Cooper, Nathan Cushing, Thomas Cushing, William Cushing, Tristram Dalton, Francis Dana, Samuel Deane, Perez Fobes, Caleb Gannett, Henry Gardner, Benjamin Guild, John Hancock, Joseph Hawley, Edward Augustus Holyoke, Ebenezer Hunt, Jonathan Jackson, Charles Jarvis, Samuel Langdon, Levi Lincoln, Daniel Little, Elijah Lothrup, John Lowell, Samuel Mather, Samuel Moody, Andrew Oliver, Joseph Orne, Theodore Parsons, George Partridge, Robert Treat Paine, Phillips Payson, Samuel Phillips, John Pickering, Oliver Prescott, Zedekiah Sanger, Nathaniel Peaslee Sargeant, Micajah Sawyer, Theodore Sedgwick, William Sever, David Sewall, Stephen Sewall, John Sprague, Ebenezer Storer, Caleb Strong, James Sullivan, John Bernard Sweat, Nathaniel Tracy, Cotton Tufts, James Warren, Samuel West, Edward Wigglesworth, Joseph Willard, Abraham Williams, Nehemiah Williams, Samuel Williams, and James Winthrop.

Members
From the beginning, the membership, nominated and elected by peers, has included not only scientists and scholars, but also writers and artists as well as representatives from the full range of professions and public life. Throughout the Academy's history, 10,000 fellows have been elected, including such notables as John Adams, Thomas Jefferson, John James Audubon, Joseph Henry, Washington Irving, Josiah Willard Gibbs, Augustus Saint-Gaudens, J. Robert Oppenheimer, Willa Cather, T. S. Eliot, Edward R. Murrow, Jonas Salk, Eudora Welty, Oprah Winfrey, Duke Ellington, and Martha Nussbaum.

International honorary members have included Jose Antonio Pantoja Hernandez, Albert Einstein, Leonhard Euler, Marquis de Lafayette, Alexander von Humboldt, Leopold von Ranke, Charles Darwin, Otto Hahn, Jawaharlal Nehru, Pablo Picasso, Liu Guosong, Lucian Michael Freud, Luis Buñuel, Galina Ulanova, Werner Heisenberg, Alec Guinness, Ngozi Okonjo-Iweala, Menahem Yaari, Yitzhak Apeloig, Zvi Galil, Haim Harari, and Sebastião Salgado.

Astronomer Maria Mitchell was the first woman elected to the Academy, in 1848.

The current membership encompasses over 5,700 members based across the United States and around the world. Academy members include more than 250 Nobel laureates and more than 60 Pulitzer Prize winners.

Of the Academy’s 14,343 members since 1780, 1,406 are or have been affiliated with Harvard University, 611 with the Massachusetts Institute of Technology, 433 with Yale University, 425 with the University of California, Berkeley, and 404 with Stanford University.  The following table includes those institutions affiliated with 300 or more members.  

† Excludes members affiliated exclusively with associated national laboratories.

Classes and sections
The current membership is divided into five classes and twenty-four sections.

Class I – Mathematical and physical sciences
 Section 1. Mathematics, applied mathematics and statistics
 Section 2. Physics
 Section 3. Chemistry
 Section 4. Astronomy (including astrophysics) and earth science
 Section 5. Engineering sciences and technologies
 Section 6. Computer science (including artificial intelligence and information technologies)

Class II – Biological sciences
 Section 1. Biochemistry, biophysics and molecular biology
 Section 2. Cellular and developmental biology, microbiology and immunology (including genetics)
 Section 3. Neurosciences, cognitive sciences, and behavioral biology
 Section 4. Evolutionary and population biology and ecology
 Section 5. Medical sciences (including physiology and pharmacology), clinical medicine, and public health

Class III – Social sciences
 Section 1. Social and developmental psychology and education
 Section 2. Economics
 Section 3. Political science, international relations, and public policy
 Section 4. Law (including the practice of law)
 Section 5. Archaeology, anthropology, sociology, geography and demography

Class IV – Arts and humanities
 Section 1. Philosophy and religious studies
 Section 2. History
 Section 3. Literary criticism (including philology)
 Section 4. Literature (fiction, poetry, short stories, nonfiction, playwriting, screenwriting and translation)
 Section 5. Visual arts and performing arts – criticism and practice

Class V – Public affairs, business, and administration
 Section 1. Journalism and communications
 Section 2. Business, corporate and philanthropic leadership
 Section 3. Educational, scientific, cultural and philanthropic administration

Presidents, 1780–present

 1780–1790 James Bowdoin
 1791–1814 John Adams
 1814–1820 Edward Augustus Holyoke
 1820–1829 John Quincy Adams
 1829–1838 Nathaniel Bowditch
 1838–1839 James Jackson, M.D.
 1839–1846 John Pickering
 1846–1863 Jacob Bigelow
 1863–1873 Asa Gray
 1873–1880 Charles Francis Adams
 1880–1892 Joseph Lovering
 1892–1894 Josiah Parsons Cooke
 1894–1903 Alexander Agassiz
 1903–1908 William Watson Goodwin
 1908–1915 John Trowbridge
 1915–1917 Henry Pickering Walcott
 1917–1919 Charles Pickering Bowditch
 1919–1921 Theodore William Richards
 1921–1924 George Foot Moore
 1924–1927 Theodore Lyman
 1927–1931 Edwin Bidwell Wilson
 1931–1933 Jeremiah D. M. Ford
 1933–1935 George Howard Parker
 1935–1937 Roscoe Pound
 1937–1939 Dugald C. Jackson
 1939–1944 Harlow Shapley
 1944–1951 Howard Mumford Jones
 1951–1954 Edwin Herbert Land
 1954–1957 John Ely Burchard
 1957–1961 Kirtley Fletcher Mather
 1961–1964 Hudson Hoagland
 1964–1967 Paul A. Freund
 1967–1971 Talcott Parsons
 1971–1976 Harvey Brooks
 1976–1979 Victor Frederick Weisskopf
 1979–1982 
 1982–1986 Herman Feshbach
 1986–1989 Edward Hirsch Levi
 1989–1994 Leo Beranek
 1994–1997 Jaroslav Pelikan
 1997–2000 Daniel C. Tosteson
 2000–2001 James O. Freedman
 2001–2006 Patricia Meyer Spacks
 2006–2009 Emilio Bizzi
 2010–2013 Leslie C. Berlowitz
 2014–2018 Jonathan Fanton
 2019– David W. Oxtoby

See also
 American Philosophical Society
 National Academy of Engineering
 National Academy of Medicine (formerly the Institute of Medicine)
 National Academy of Sciences
List of American Academy of Arts and Sciences members

References

External links

 
 Memoirs of the American Academy of Arts and Sciences, Vol 1, 1783
 Proceedings of the American Academy of Arts and Sciences, Vol.1 (1846) – Vol.57 (1922) at Biodiversity Heritage Library

 
1780 establishments in Massachusetts
Cambridge, Massachusetts
Member organizations of the American Council of Learned Societies
Organizations established in 1780